Stanley "Stan" J. Rowan (31 August 1924 – 1997 (aged 72)) born in Liverpool, was an English professional bantam/feather/lightweight boxer of the 1940s and 1950s who won the British Boxing Board of Control (BBBofC) British bantamweight title, and British Empire bantamweight title, his professional fighting weight varied from , i.e. bantamweight to , i.e. lightweight.

Genealogical information
Stan Rowan was the son of Joseph P. Rowan and Sarah  (née Connolly) (marriage registered during October→December 1923 in West Derby district). Stan Rowan's marriage to Annie Flynn was registered during January→March 1950 in Liverpool South district.

References

External links

Image - Stan Rowan 
Image - Stan Rowan
Video - Sports Fans Meet At Manchester - Boxing 1948
Article - Stan Rowan

1924 births
1997 deaths
Bantamweight boxers
English male boxers
Featherweight boxers
Lightweight boxers
Boxers from Liverpool